Ubiquitin carboxyl-terminal hydrolase 42 is an enzyme that in humans is encoded by the USP42 gene.

References

Further reading